John Francis (born 13 November 1980) is an English cricketer who last played for St Cross Symondians. He is a left-handed batsman and an occasional slow left-arm bowler.

Francis was both at Bromley in Kent and educated at King Edward VI School, Southampton followed by Durham and Loughborough universities.

He originally represented Hampshire in the Second XI Championship in 1998 and then the Hampshire Cricket Board in the 38-County Cup in 1999. His first-class debut was for Hampshire in 2001 and he played for them until 2003 but moved on after not accepting a new two-year contract with the team. He played first-class cricket for British Universities in 2002 and 2003 and for Loughborough UCCE in 2003.

In 2004 he joined Somerset. His top score for Somerset is 125* against Yorkshire at Leeds in 2005. In all he scored over 1000 first-class runs in 2005 at an average of over 40 but in 5 matches in 2006 averaged under 15. At the end of the 2006 season he had played 32 first-class matches for Somerset at an average of nearly 35.

His brother is Simon Francis.

References

External links

Somerset County Cricket Club Pen Picture

Hampshire cricketers
Somerset cricketers
English cricketers
1980 births
Living people
Loughborough MCCU cricketers
Alumni of Loughborough University
Hampshire Cricket Board cricketers
British Universities cricketers
Alumni of Durham University